Bukkapatnam is a village in Sri Sathya Sai district of the Indian state of Andhra Pradesh. It is the headquarters of Bukkapatnam mandal in Puttaparthi revenue division

Geography 

It has an average elevation of 508 metres (1669 ft). Bukkapatnam is located near Puttaparthi. Bukkapatnam has an area of 351.17 km², and a population of 37,635.

Demographics 

 census, the village had a population of 12,196. The total population constitutes 6,081 males and 6,115 females —a sex ratio of 1006 females per 1000 males. 1,269 children are in the age group of 0–6 years, of which 655 are boys and 614 are girls —a ratio of 937 per 1000. The average literacy rate stands at 74.03% with 6,996 literates, significantly higher than the state average of 67.41%.

References 

Villages in Sri Sathya Sai district
Mandal headquarters in Sri Sathya Sai district